Pilot PMR is a strategy and design agency based in the St. Lawrence neighbourhood in downtown Toronto, Canada, near the city’s historic Distillery District. The agency provides branding and digital development, strategic communications, marketing, and UX services to clients across Canada and internationally.

Pilot PMR also offers media and presentation coaching for executives and spokespersons.

Clients 

Higher Education
 University of Waterloo, Faculty of Engineering
 University of Waterloo Stratford Campus
 McMaster University, School of Biomedical Engineering
 McMaster University, W Booth School of Engineering Practice
 McMaster University, MiNDS Graduate Program of Neuroscience
 Xerox Centre for Engineering Entrepreneurship and Innovation
 CommerceLab

Services

Notable staff 
 Alex Mangiola: Vice President. Alex began his career working for newspapers throughout Ontario, including The Windsor Star, Chatham Daily News, Guelph Mercury and Simcoe Reformer. His first forays into marketing included representing Cuban state companies such as Habanos and Cubanacan in Canada, as well as several Ontario government clients like the Ontario Human Rights Commission, Ontario Tourism and the Ontario Ministry of Research and Innovation. Alex has worked extensively in Toronto’s not-for-profit sector for clients such as United Way of Toronto, Woodgreen Community Services, Ontario Association of Food Banks, East Scarborough Boys and Girls Club, as well as the recently formed Addictions and Mental Health Ontario. His is an active member of the Maytree Foundation’s DiverseCity Voices, a group of subject matter experts from under-represented ethnic or racial groups designed to enrich the quality of print, radio and television news in Toronto.
 Sarah Lazarovic founded Torontoist, and served as an editorial cartoonist for The Ottawa Citizen and Vancouver Sun. As a digital journalist, she filed live sketch reports from events for Maclean’s magazine, and charted monthly news events for the National Post and I Love Charts. Lazarovic made two shorts for the National Film Board. Her work has been screened at festivals around the world and on CBC’s Rough Cuts and Canadian Reflections.

References 

Companies based in Toronto
Public relations companies of Canada